Anthony Chachere (June 14, 1905 – March 19, 1995) was an American businessman and chef best known as the founder of his eponymous Tony Chachere's Creole Foods seasonings and ingredients brand and its original product, Tony Chachere's Original Creole Seasoning. He was the first inductee into the Louisiana Chefs Hall of Fame, receiving that honor in 1995, just one week before his death.

Early and personal life
Chachere was born on June 14, 1905 in Opelousas, Louisiana to Tilghman George and Nina Celestine, the fifth of seven children. He died there on March 19, 1995.

Chachere was married to Patricia (née Kerr) and had four children.

Career
 During the Great Depression he worked as a traveling drug salesman. At age 30, he started his own drug wholesale business, the Louisiana Drug Company (LADCO), with $100. At times working from his garage, he created his own elixirs, including Mamou Cough Syrup and Bon Soir Bug insect repellent. LADCO eventually became a million-dollar business, and Chachere retired for the first time at age 50.

Two years later, Chachere began working for the Equitable Life Insurance Society. He remained there for 13 years, making the Millionaires Club every year and being honored in the company's Hall of Fame. Chachere retired for the second time at age 65.

Cooking and writing

In 1972, drawing upon a life of cooking for friends and family, Chachere published his first cookbook, Cajun Country Cookbook, which included the recipe that became his Original Creole Seasoning. Positive public response to the book led him to start Tony Chachere's Creole Foods.

At age 76, Chachere formally retired from the food business, but continued developing recipes and new food products. He is said to have been a vivid storyteller, avid cook and always full of life. Chachere frequently autographed his books with laissez les bons temps rouler (let the good times roll). In 1995, he died just shy of his 90th birthday.

Tony Chachere's Creole Foods is now owned by Chachere's remaining descendants and is run by Don Chachere, his grandson.  It continues to offer a variety of cookbooks, seasoning blends, dinner mixes, marinades, sauces, batters, and frozen items.

References

External links 
 Company Website

1905 births
1995 deaths
People from Opelousas, Louisiana
American chefs
American male chefs
Cajun people